is a 2015 anime television series by Tatsunoko Production. The series celebrates the 40th anniversary of the Time Bokan franchise and is inspired by Tatsunoko's 1970s anime series Yatterman. The series aired in Japan between January 13, 2015 and March 31, 2015 and is licensed in North America by Funimation.

Plot
A long time ago, the Yattermen were heroes of justice who fought against the evil Doronbow Gang, exiling them and bringing peace to the Yatter Kingdom. Several generations later, however, the Yattermen have since become corrupt with power while everyone else has been forced to live in poverty and despair. After losing her mother to the Yattermen's selfishness, Leopard, a direct descendant of the gang's leader Doronjo, reforms the Doronbow Gang with Boyacky and Tonzra's descendants, Voltkatze and Elephantus, to rebel against the corrupt Yattermen.

Characters
 

A 9-year old girl who is a direct descendant of the Doronbow Gang's leader, Doronjo. When her mother dies as a result of the current Yattermen not allowing her to get the medicine she needed, Leopard reforms the Doronbow Gang to take vengeance against the Yatter Kingdom.

  

Boyacky's descendant, who serves as the brain of the group by creating various machines out of bits and pieces.

 

Tonzra's descendant, who serves as the brawn of the group with his large and strong build.

A skull that fell to Earth long ago and helped form the original Doronbow Gang. It is later revealed that he is the one posing as the current Yatterman as revenge against humanity for his past failures.

Leopard's pet pig. Able to speak, he takes the role of the funny little pig robot cheering up the original Doronbow Gang.

 Yatterman-1

A 17-year old boy whose parents were killed by the evil mastermind whom he believed to be the "Yatterman". He is nicknamed Gatchan. He joins the Doronbow Gang on their journey, making them their new outfits. He generally lacks self-confidence, often using a dice to make his decisions. As time goes on, he starts having lessons on mechanics from Voltkatze. He is childhood friends with Alouette and is very protective of her. Doronjo has feelings for him, a fact she takes some time to accept. By the time the evil mastermind whose masquerading as the Yatterman known as Dokurobey is revealed, he becomes the new Yatterman-1 in episode 12.

 Yatterman-2

A 17-year old girl and childhood friend of Galina, who calls her Ally for short. Like Galina, her parents were killed by the evil mastermind whom believed to be the "Yatterman", but she is in denial over their deaths. She is very kind-hearted and considers Leopard to be her angel. By the time the evil mastermind whose masquerading as the Yatterman known as Dokurobey is revealed, she becomes the new Yatterman-2 in episode 12.

A general working for Yatterman Army. He uses Yatterpug as his robot weapon and fights with an electrical cane. He is hinted to know Galina from before and his dog is friendly with Galina. He is later revealed to be Alouette's father, who converted into a cyborg by Dokurobey and wiped of his memories. After regaining his memories, he sacrifices himself to help out Allouette without her ever knowing his fate.

A group of cyborgs who, along with Goro, form twelve generals serving Yatterman. They were all programmed so that they can only identify Dokurobey as the true Yatterman. Their respective names, based on numbers, are Ichiro, Jiro, Saburo, Shiro, Rokuro, Nana, Hachi-Yellow, Kyuro, Juro, Juichiro, and Juniro.

Robotics soldiers modelled after the original Yatterman-1 and Yatterman-2, of which there are a large quantity of. Before the advent of General Goro, their field leader was a composite robot, half Yatterman-1 and half Yatterman-2. Instead of the original Kenda-magic and Electric Cane of their human predecessors, they use deadly laser pistols.

Leopard's mother, who died from illness after the Yattermen refused to let Leopard and the others obtain medicine for her.

Production
The series by Tatsunoko Production began aired in Japan between January 13, 2015 and March 31, 2015. The series is directed by Tatsuya Yoshihara and written by Kazuyuki Fudeyasu, with music by Tatsuya Katou and character design by Keisuke Goto. The anime is licensed in North America by Funimation, who are simulcast the series as it aired.

Episode list

References

External links
Official site 

2015 anime television series debuts
Japanese adult animated comic science fiction television series
Japanese adult animated science fantasy television series
Tatsunoko Production
Science fiction anime and manga
Time Bokan Series
Funimation
Tokyo MX original programming
Yomiuri Telecasting Corporation original programming